Roversi is an Italian surname. Notable people with the surname include:

 Alba Roversi (born 1961), Venezuelan telenovela and theater actress 
 Paolo Roversi (born 1947), Italian-born fashion photographer
 Roberto Roversi (1923–2012), Italian poet, writer and journalist

Italian-language surnames